The David E. Grange Jr. Best Ranger Competition is an annual competition held in Fort Benning, Georgia, hosted by the Airborne and Ranger Training Brigade. It is a two-man team competition where competitors must be active military who are Ranger Qualified.

The Best Ranger Competition was first held in 1982. The first competitions were limited to Ranger units, but from 1984 onwards it accepted teams from throughout the Army. As of 2018, the competition involves 50 two-man teams, mostly from the 75th Ranger Regiment and the ARTB, but also including a Coast Guard team. The competition takes 62 hours and involves tests of physical fitness, including runs and marches, and of marksmanship. The exact composition of events changes yearly.

CPT Mike Rose won BRC for the 3rd time in his career in 2019, making him the only Service Member to win it three times (two with the same partner, one with another), making him the Best Ranger in History. Three people have won the competition twice, all with different partners for the two victories.

CPT Mike Rose also only entered 3 times and won on all occasions. In 2014 he entered as a 2Lt. while at 25th Infantry Division  with 2Lt. John Bergman - making them the youngest winners. In 2017 while at 75 Ranger Regiment CPT Mike Rose entered and won with MSG. Joshua Horsager (at 39 years old making Joshua the oldest winner) In 2019 CPT. Mike Rose entered again with CPT. John Bergman while representing 101st Airborne Division. 
In 2019 the rules were modified to allow contestants a maximum of 3 entries over their career making CPT. Mike Rose accomplishment highly unlikely to equal.

Sergeant Major Thomas Payne, who won the 2012 competition as a Sergeant First Class, had his Distinguished Service Cross upgraded to the Medal of Honor. He was presented the Medal of Honor by President Donald Trump on September 11, 2020, the 19th anniversary of the September 11 attacks.

The 2020 Competition was scheduled to be from April 16–18 but due to the ongoing COVID-19 pandemic, officials decided to cancel the 2020 event but with plans to continue with the 2021 competition.

List of winners 
Past winners:

References

External links

 

United States Army Rangers